Lakewood is an unincorporated community in Walton County, Florida, United States, located in the Florida panhandle. Lakewood is on the Florida/Alabama border near Florida's highest point, Britton Hill (345 feet). Lakewood and most of Walton County differ from the rest of Florida in terms of scenery and geography, and the fauna and flora are those typical of the Deep South.

References

Unincorporated communities in Walton County, Florida
Unincorporated communities in Florida